Ziak is a village in the Badakhshan Province of north-eastern Afghanistan.

See also
Badakhshan Province

References

External links 
Satellite map at Maplandia.com 

Populated places in Badakhshan Province